Pilar Homem de Melo (Lisbon, July 5, 1963) is a Portuguese singer-songwriter and one of the main responsible of the New Pop Music in Portugal.

Biography

Pilar moved to Rio de Janeiro in 1975 along with her family, where meets the most relevant representatives of Música popular brasileira (MPB) – emphasizing the great friendship made with Caetano Veloso – who decisively influenced her music.

She graduated at Berklee College of Music, Boston, in 1985.

In 1988 she signed with EMI label releasing in the following year, her homonymous debut album produced by Wayne Shorter. In 1991 acts in the first part of Suzanne Vega's concert, in the Cascais Pavilion and in Oporto Coliseum.

In 1993 she released the album Pecado Original, recorded at Marcus Studio in London, produced by Steve Davis, with the participation of Vicente Amigo.

She presents in 2000, together with Anamar and Né Ladeiras, the SM-58 show which was released in 2002 the CD Live – Anamar Né Ladeiras Pilar.

In 2001 she release the CD Nao quero saber and in 2003 the album Poe um bocadinho + alto.

In 2005 Pilar presents "Cristal" concert at the Great Hall of São Luiz Theatre in Lisbon. This show was presented with new compositions and versions of themes such as "Fria Claridade" by Pedro Homem de Mello and "Um Indio" by Caetano Veloso with the participation of the Senegalese percussionist Thio Mbaye .

In 2006 Pilar traveled to Senegal where she worked on new arrangements and compositions with Habib Faye and Thio Mbaye performing at Casino du Cap Vert in Dakar.

Pilar moved to Spain in 2011.

References

Discography

1989 – Pilar
1993 – Pecado Original
2001 – Não Quero Saber
2002 – Ao Vivo (Pilar with Né Ladeiras and Anamar)
2003 – Põe um Bocadinho + Alto

External links
Official website
 Árvore genealógica de Pilar Homem de Melo

1963 births
Living people
Portuguese women singer-songwriters
Portuguese singer-songwriters
Portuguese musicians
Singers from Lisbon